This is a list of the Polish, Czech and German names of places in Cieszyn Silesia.

See also
 List of European exonyms
 Polish minority in the Czech Republic
 Zaolzie

Notes

References 
 
 Ludwig Patryn (ed), Die Ergebnisse der Volkszählung vom 31. Dezember 1910 in Schlesien, Troppau, 1912

 
Exonyms
Cieszyn Silesia
Cieszyn Silesia
Cieszyn
Cieszyn